Marianna Lymperta (born June 25, 1979) is an Olympic and national-record holding swimmer from Greece. She has swum for Greece at the:
Olympics: 2000, 2004, 2008, 2012
World Championships: 2003, 2009, 2011, 2013
European Championships: 2010
Mediterranean Games: 2001, 2005, 2013
Open Water Worlds: 2008, 2010

At the 2010 European Championships, she set the Greek Records in the women's 800 and 1500 free (8:34.81 and 16:20.11).

At the 2012 Summer Olympics, she competed in the Women's marathon 10 kilometre, finishing in last place.

References

Greek female swimmers
Year of birth missing (living people)
Living people
Olympic swimmers of Greece
Swimmers at the 2004 Summer Olympics
Swimmers at the 2008 Summer Olympics
Swimmers at the 2012 Summer Olympics
Female long-distance swimmers
World Aquatics Championships medalists in open water swimming
Panathinaikos swimmers
Mediterranean Games silver medalists for Greece
Mediterranean Games bronze medalists for Greece
Mediterranean Games medalists in swimming
Swimmers at the 2001 Mediterranean Games
Swimmers at the 2005 Mediterranean Games
Swimmers at the 2013 Mediterranean Games
20th-century Greek women
21st-century Greek women